Xanthophyllum reticulatum is a plant in the family Polygalaceae. The specific epithet  is from the Latin meaning "netted", referring to the leaf veins.

Description
The bark is whitish. The flowers are purple, drying pale pink-brown.

Distribution and habitat
Xanthophyllum reticulatum is endemic to Borneo. Its habitat is mixed dipterocarp forest from sea-level to  altitude.

References

reticulatum
Endemic flora of Borneo
Plants described in 1929